Burnupia is a genus of small freshwater snails or limpets, aquatic gastropod mollusks that are traditionally placed in the family Planorbidae.

However, according to the molecular markers (COI, 18S rRNA), the genus Burnupia differs from ancylids and from Planorboidea.

Distribution 
This genus is generally confined to Africa and Brazil.

Species 
The number of species in the genus Burnupia is highly uncertain and there are 21 specific names recognized. Also in 2011 IUCN Red List there are recognized 21 species: 19 of them are Data Deficient, and Burnupia crassistriata and Burnupia stuhlmanni with Near Threatened status. There are probably "only few" species of Burnupia.

Species in the genus Burnupia include:
 Burnupia alta Pilsbry & Bequaert, 1927
 Burnupia brunnea Walker, 1924
 Burnupia caffra (Krauss, 1848) - type species
 Burnupia capensis (Walker, 1912)
 Burnupia crassistriata (Preston, 1911)
 Burnupia edwardiana Pilsbry & Bequaert, 1927
 Burnupia farquhari (Walker, 1912)
 Burnupia gordonensis (Melvill & Ponsonby, 1903)
 Burnupia ingae Lanzer, 1991 
 Burnupia kempi (Preston, 1912)
 Burnupia kimiloloensis Pilsbry & Bequaert, 1927
 Burnupia mooiensis (Walker, 1912)
 Burnupia nana (Walker, 1912)
 Burnupia obtusata Walker, 1926
 Burnupia ponsonbyi Walker, 1924
 Burnupia stenochorias (Melvill & Ponsonby, 1903)
 Burnupia stuhlmanni (von Martens, 1897)
 Burnupia transvaalensis (Craven, 1880)
 Burnupia trapezoidea (Boettger, 1910)
 Burnupia verreauxi (Bourguignat, 1853)
 Burnupia walkeri Pilsbry & Bequaert, 1927

Ecology 
Burnupia live in well-oxygenated freshwater habitats.

References 

Planorbidae
Taxonomy articles created by Polbot